Hans Einar Magnus Wislander (born 22 February 1964) is a Swedish former handball player, who has been voted Handball Player of the Century. Since his debut in the national team in 1985 he has played over 380 games and scored over 1,000 goals. He played for Redbergslids IK, Gothenburg and THW Kiel.

Club Honours

Redbergslid
Elitserien (5): 1984-85, 1985–86, 1986–87, 1988–89, 2002–03

Kiel
Bundesliga (7): 1993-94 , 1994–95 , 1995–96 , 1997–98 , 1998–99 , 1999-00 , 2001–02
DHB-Pokal (3): 1998, 1999, 2000
Supercup (2): 1995, 1998
EHF Cup Winners' Cup (2): 1998, 2002

Individual
IHF World Player of the Year - 1990
Best player of the 20th century by: IHF
Best player of the 20th century by: Sweden
Elected best player of THW Kiel in the 20th  century
Record for caps and goals in the Swedish national team
Best player at 2002 European Championship
Elected best handball player of the year in Sweden: 1986 and 1990
Elected best handball player of the year in Germany: 2000
Voted Best foreign player of Bundesliga: 1994, 1995, 1996
Voted Best Player THW Kiel: 1994, 1995, 1996, 1997, 1998, 1999

World Championships
1990 - gold
1993 - bronze
1995 - bronze
1997 - silver
1999 - gold
2001 - silver

European Championships
1994 - gold
1998 - gold
2000 - gold
2002 - gold

See also
List of handballers with 1000 or more international goals

External links 
 
 

1964 births
Living people
Swedish male handball players
Olympic handball players of Sweden
Handball-Bundesliga players with retired numbers
Handball players at the 1988 Summer Olympics
Handball players at the 1992 Summer Olympics
Handball players at the 1996 Summer Olympics
Handball players at the 2000 Summer Olympics
Olympic silver medalists for Sweden
Swedish expatriate sportspeople in Germany
Handball players from Gothenburg
Olympic medalists in handball
Redbergslids IK players
THW Kiel players
Medalists at the 2000 Summer Olympics
Medalists at the 1996 Summer Olympics
Medalists at the 1992 Summer Olympics
20th-century Swedish people
21st-century Swedish people